Juliana Oluwatobiloba Olayode , also known as Toyo Baby, a sobriquet she got from starring as Toyosi in the series Jenifa's Diary; is a Nigerian actress and sexual purity activist. She is also known for being a public critic of sex before marriage among Nigerian youths.

Early life 
She is a multiple-award winning actress, MC, inspirational speaker, and brand ambassador. Juliana was born into a family of eight and was brought up in Lagos, Nigeria. Olayode hails from Ipokia local government of Ogun State. While growing up, she never thought she would become an actress even though she was a drama queen.

Career
Before she came to the limelight, she had featured in about four movies including Couple of Days where she featured as "Judith". She clinched the role in Jenifa's Diary after attending the audition. She has gone on to become a household name in the Nigeria movie industry. Despite gradually becoming a household name due to her role as Toyo Baby on the hit TV series, Olayode maintains her image as the girl next door. She strives to stay grounded despite the tendencies of fame and fortune.

Autobiography
In the second half of 2017, Olayode published her autobiography, Rebirth: From Grass to Grace. In the book, she talks about her personal life, sexual abuse, and career struggles.

Filmography 

She has featured in some movies, including:
 Jenifa's Diary
 Where Does Beauty Go
 Rivers Between
 Couple of Days
Life of disaster
Move on
Bridezilia
The Cokers
Becoming Abi

See also
 List of Nigerian film producers

External links

References

Living people
Actresses from Lagos State
Yoruba actresses
Nigerian film actresses
Nigerian television actresses
Participants in Nigerian reality television series
21st-century Nigerian actresses
Nigerian film producers
1995 births
People from Ogun State